Panos Kolokotronis was the eldest son of the Greek General Theodoros Kolokotronis and his mother was Aikaterini Karousou. He was born on the island of Zakynthos in 1800, while his father was serving there as a Major in the British Infantry. He fought along with his father in the Greek War of Independence and distinguished himself in many battles.

In 1822, he married Eleni, the daughter of Laskarina Bouboulina.

In 1825, during the second civil war, he was murdered in Tripoli by order of the revolutionary government.

His skull is on display in the National Historical Museum in Athens.

See also 
 Theodoros Kolokotronis
 Gennaios Kolokotronis

Greek military leaders of the Greek War of Independence
People murdered in Greece
Panos
People from Zakynthos